Wood Dalling is a village and civil parish in Norfolk, England.

The villages name means 'Dalla's people'. 'Wood' distinguish from Field Dalling.

For the purposes of local government, the parish falls within the district of Broadland. The parish includes the hamlets of Norton Corner and Tyby.

The parish formed part of the hundred of Eynesford. Today, the parish forms part of the ward of Eynesford, which returns a councillor to Broadland District Council.

Two places in the parish are mentioned in the Domesday Book — Dalling and Tyby.

Adjacent parishes include Guestwick, Heydon, Salle and Thurning.

There is a village hall, with part-time post office, at Norton Corner.

There is a waymarked circular cycle trail along lanes around the parish and its immediate environs — the Wood Dalling Cycle Loop.

Notes

External links

Wood Dalling Church Website - Reepham Benefice
Information from Genuki Norfolk on Wood Dalling

Villages in Norfolk
Civil parishes in Norfolk
Broadland